Abubakr Abakarov (born 28 January 1999) is a Russian-Azerbaijani freestyle wrestler of Chechen ethnicity. He won one of the bronze medals in the men's 86 kg event at the 2021 World Wrestling Championships held in Oslo, Norway.

In 2019, he won the silver medal in the men's 79 kg event at the World U23 Wrestling Championship in Budapest, Hungary.

He won the gold medal in his event at the 2022 European U23 Wrestling Championship held in Plovdiv, Bulgaria. A few months later, he won the gold medal in his event at the Matteo Pellicone Ranking Series 2022 held in Rome, Italy. He competed in the 86kg event at the 2022 World Wrestling Championships held in Belgrade, Serbia.

References

External links 
 

Living people
1999 births
Azerbaijani male sport wrestlers
World Wrestling Championships medalists
People from Khasavyurt
Islamic Solidarity Games competitors for Azerbaijan
Islamic Solidarity Games medalists in wrestling
21st-century Azerbaijani people
21st-century Russian people